Mass media in Nigeria has an interesting and long history.

Media culture

Historically, Nigeria has boasted the most free and outspoken press of any African country, but also one which has consistently been the target of harassment by the past military dictatorships. Many agents of Nigeria's press have been imprisoned, exiled, tortured, or murdered as a result, among them being Ogoni activist and television producer Ken Saro-Wiwa, who was executed for treason by order of the Sani Abacha dictatorship in 1995 (resulting in the expulsion of Nigeria from the Commonwealth of Nations and sanctions from abroad).

Even under the somewhat less-oppressive current civilian government, journalists have continued to come under fire, be it from the government (as with the June 2006 arrest of Gbenga Aruleba and Rotimi Durojaiye of African Independent Television under charges of sedition) or from other popular establishments (such as the self-imposed exile of Thisday's Isioma Daniel following the riots in Northern Nigeria over "sensitive comments" which she had made in an article regarding Muhammad and the 2002 Miss World pageant.

A fatwa calling for her beheading was issued by the mullahs of northern Nigeria, but was declared null and void by the relevant religious authorities in Saudi Arabia, and the Obasanjo faced an international public relations smearing (especially within journalistic circles) in the aftermath, which was not helped by the Amina Lawal controversy which had occurred prior to the riots, which had seen over 200 dead). However, as with most other countries, blogging has increasingly become a much safer, and much easier, conduit for Nigeria's growing Internet-enabled minority to express their dissatisfactions with the current state of affairs in Nigeria.

Media corruption 

Brown envelope journalism in Nigeria is a practice whereby monetary inducement is given to journalists to make them write a positive story or kill a negative story. The name is derived from cash inducements hidden in brown envelopes and given to journalists during press briefings. It is a common practice in Nigeria and many journalists do know that it is unethical. One of the effects is that the Nigerian media has become a hotbed for sponsored stories.

Mediums

Newspapers 

Until the 1990s most publications were government-owned, but private papers such as the Nigerian Tribune, The Punch, Vanguard, and the Guardian continued to expose public and private scandals.
Laws related to the media, including newspapers, are scattered across various pieces of legislature.
There are few good sources of discussion and analysis of these laws.

An analysis of newspapers shows a strong bias towards coverage of males, reflecting prevalent cultural biases. Few articles discuss women and there are few photographs of women outside the fashion sections.
Although earnings have declined since the late 1980s the number of publications has steadily grown.
As of 2008 there were over 100 national, regional or local newspapers.

Radio and television

While newspapers (and, most recently, blogging) have long thrived in Nigeria, radio and television has not received as much recognition, due to limited resources and press restrictions which beset the establishment of radio or television services in Nigeria. However, such limitations have since been improved in order to reach larger audiences both within and without Nigeria, such as with the growth of satellite television. The BBC World Service as well as the Voice of America and the German broadcasting organization Deutsche Welle (DW) also provide shortwave radio in the Hausa language.

Most viewed channels

Internet sites

Virtually all Nigerian newspapers have an internet presence; in addition, there are several websites which are dedicated to allowing Nigerians to air their opinions on a variety of topics.

See also
Elite advertisement in Nigeria
List of Nigerian newspapers
Telecommunications in Nigeria
 Cinema of Nigeria

References

Bibliography
  
  
 
 
 
  (Includes information about newspapers, radio, TV, etc.)

External links
 

 
Nigeria
Nigeria